XHPVA-FM is a radio station on 90.3 FM in Puerto Vallarta, Jalisco, Mexico.

History
XHPVA received its concession on March 20, 1992. It was owned by Julio Velarde y Achucarro, whose family continues to own the station today.

On February 1, 2022, XHPVA ended its affiliation with Grupo ACIR, eliminating the romantic brand as Amor, GlobalMedia would change the station to Radiópolis W Radio brand.

References

Spanish-language radio stations
Radio stations in Jalisco
Radio stations established in 1992